Gamaudi is a village development committee in Dailekh District in Karnali Province of western-central Nepal. At the time of the 1991 Nepal census it had a population of 2948 people living in 568 individual households.

References

External links
UN map of the municipalities of Dailekh District

Populated places in Dailekh District